Bangladesh–United Arab Emirates relations refer to the bilateral relations between Bangladesh and United Arab Emirates.

History
Muhammad Imran is the resident ambassador of Bangladesh to UAE. In 2014 Bangladesh announced visa on arrival for UAE nationals. UAE stopped issuing visas for Bangladeshis after Bangladesh voted for Moscow for the host city of World Expo 2020 and not Dubai. Dubai ultimately was elected the host city. Dubai has denied the existence of a visa ban. UAE has an embassy in Bangladesh.

Economic
As of December 2016 there are an estimated 700,000 thousand Bangladeshi migrants in UAE. Trade between the Bangladesh and UAE stood at 967 million dollar in the 2012-2013 period. UAE has investments of 2.9 billion dollar in Bangladesh.

See also 
 Foreign relations of Bangladesh
 Foreign relations of the United Arab Emirates

References

 
United Arab Emirates
Bilateral relations of the United Arab Emirates